The Attorney-General of Samoa is a constitutional and legal officer in Samoa, responsible for advising the government on legal matters and bringing criminal proceedings. The current Attorney-General is Su'a Hellene Wallwork.

The Attorney-General is established as a constitutional officer by clause 41 of the Constitution of Samoa. They are appointed by the O le Ao o le Malo acting on the advice of the Prime Minister of Samoa and must be qualified to be a Judge of the Supreme Court of Samoa. Further functions of the office are specified in the Attorney General's Office Act 2013. In addition to serving as chief executive of the Attorney General's Office, the Attorney-General also has a statutory duty to attend and advise the Cabinet of Samoa, and to supervise legal services and officials in other Ministries and government agencies. In performing their legal and constitutional functions, the Attorney-General is statutorily independent.

List of Attorneys-General of Samoa

 Tuiloma Neroni Slade (1976 - 1982)
 Misa Telefoni Retzlaff (1986 - 1988)
 Patu Tiava'asu'e Falefatu Sapolu (1988 - 1991)
 Tupa'i Seapa
 Brenda Heather-Latu (1997 - 2006)
 Ming Leung Wai (2006 - 2016)
 Lemalu Herman Retzlaff (2016 - 2020)
 Savalenoa Mareva Betham Annandale (2020 - 2021)
 Su'a Hellene Wallwork (2021 -)

References

External links
 Office of the Attorney-General

Government of Samoa
Attorneys General of Samoa
Prosecution